Monte is a neighborhood on the island of Saint John in the United States Virgin Islands. The local government calls this neighborhood Rendezvous and Ditleff.

References

Populated places in Saint John, U.S. Virgin Islands